Piano Lesson was a British television series which aired on the BBC during 1950. It was hosted by the pianist, teacher and broadcaster Sidney Harrison. The first series was aimed at beginners, while the second series intermediate students. Harrison also gave piano lessons on other programmes during the 1950s, including the BBC's children's session.

The series is likely lost, as very few telerecordings exist of BBC television from before 1953.

See also

How to Play the Piano

References

External links
Piano Lesson on IMDb

1950s British music television series
1950 British television series debuts
1950 British television series endings
Lost BBC episodes
BBC Television shows
Black-and-white British television shows